Baby Madaha (born 19 November 1988 in Tanzania, Mwanza) is a Tanzanian actress and musician. She was the winner of Bongo Star Search competition in 2007. Baby Madaha is popularly known for her hit single Amore. She also won a German award for her role in the movie Nani. Some of the films she acted are Blessed by god, Tifu la mwaka, Misukosuko and Ray of hope. In 2013, Baby Madaha was signed by a Kenyan music label called Candy n Candy.

Discography

References

External links

 
 
 
 

1988 births
Living people
Tanzanian film actresses
21st-century Tanzanian women singers
People from Mwanza Region
21st-century Tanzanian actresses
 Swahili-language singers
 Tanzanian musicians